Events from the year 1523 in Ireland.

Incumbent
Lord: Henry VIII

Events
 January – Gerald FitzGerald, 9th Earl of Kildare was permitted to return to Ireland.
 Calendar of Papal Letters relating to Great Britain & Ireland, Volume XXIII, Part 1 (1523-1534) Clement VII on The Irish Manuscripts Commission (IMC)

Births
 Richard Creagh Born in Limerick about 1523.

Deaths

References

 
1520s in Ireland
Ireland
Years of the 16th century in Ireland